Godaan is a famous Hindi novel by Munshi Premchand. It was first published in 1936 and is considered one of the greatest Hindi novels of modern Indian literature. Themed around the socio-economic deprivation as well as the exploitation of the village poor, the novel was the last complete novel of Premchand. It has been translated into English in 1957 by Jai Ratan and Purushottama Lal as The Gift of a Cow. A 1968 translation by Gordon C. Roadarmel is now considered "a classic in itself".

Godaan was made into a Hindi film in 1963, starring Raaj Kumar, Kamini Kaushal, Mehmood and Shashikala. In 2004, Godaan was part of the 27-episode TV series, Tehreer.... Munshi Premchand Ki, based on the writing of Premchand, starring Pankaj Kapur and Surekha Sikri, directed by Gulzar and produced by Doordarshan.

Plot
The story revolves around many characters representing the various sections of Indian community. The peasant and rural society is represented by the family of Hori Mahato and his family includes his wife Dhania, daughters Rupa and Sona, son Gobar, daughter-in-law Jhunia. The story begins with Hori wanting to have a cow as other millions of poor peasants. He purchased, on debt of Rs. 80, a cow from Bhola, a cowherd. Hori tried to cheat his brothers for 10 rupees. This in turn led to a fight between his wife and his younger brother, Heera's wife. Jealous of Hori, his younger brother Heera poisoned the cow and ran away because of the fear of police action. When the police came inquiring the death of the cow, Hori took a loan and paid the bribe to the police and was able to clear off his younger brother's name. Jhunia, the daughter of Bhola, was a widow and eloped with Gobar after she got pregnant by him. Because of the fear of the action from villagers Gobar also ran away to the town. Hori and Dhania were unable to throw a girl carrying their son's child and gave her protection and accepted her as their daughter-in-law. The village panchayat fines Hori as his wife tackles the personal attack of the Pandit on them for sheltering Jhunia. Hori again is compelled to take a loan and pay the penalty.

Hori is in huge debt from local money lenders and eventually married off his daughter Rupa for mere 200 rupees to save his ancestral land from being auctioned because of his inability to pay land tax. But his determination to pay those 200 rupees and to have a cow to provide milk to his grand son, leads to Hori's death because of excessive work. When he is about to die, his wife Dhania took out all the money she had (1.25 rupees) and made Hori pay the priest on behalf of godaan (cow donation). This eventually fulfils the traditional dream of Hori but still his desire to pay back the 200 rupees to his son-in-law and to have a cow to feed the milk to his grandson remain unfulfilled.

Hori is shown as a typical poor peasant who is the victim of circumstances and possess all the deficiencies of common man but despite all this, he stands by his honesty, duties and judgement when time requires. He is shown dead partially satisfied and partially unsatisfied towards the end of the story. In a way, Hori stays true to his beliefs hence making the ending bittersweet.

Characters
 Hori is a peasant who is married to Dhania and has two daughters and a son. He is an up-righteous man and struggles throughout his life to preserve his up-righteousness. He has two younger brothers and he considers his obligation as the eldest brother to help them, sacrificing his own family. He bribes the police officers who come to the village enquiring the death of his cow. Thus, he saves the police from entering his brother, Heera's house for a search. He is a man who is bound to the community and considers the verdict of the panchayat as final. He is penalised for the death of the cow and accepts. He feels orphaned to be out of the community and hence accepts the penalty levied by the panchayat when Gobar brings home a low-caste girl. Similarly, he allows Bhola to take his ox away as he is neither able to pay the cost of it nor willing expel Jhunia from his house. They have accepted her as their daughter-in-law and her child as their grandchild. He is kind and generous. He gives shelter to Seliya, a cobbler's daughter who is exploited by Matadin, a Brahmin, and is shirked by her own people. 
 Dhania is Hori's wife, devoted to him and always supportive to him. She is bold and fiery and cannot tolerate injustice. She raises her voice against injustice, against the wishes of Hori and irritates him. She is vexed when Hori puts up with much oppression from the money lenders and the Brahmin priest. Hori, though he beats her at times for disobeying him, knows that her arguments are correct. She makes him see the truth and the reality of facts. Unlike him, she is not lost in rigmarole of clichés and ideals. She stands by what she thinks is correct and her dharma, rather than the traditional principles of the community. She knowingly accepts into her household, a low-caste girl, as her daughter-in-law. She does not blame only Jhunia for placing them in an embarrassing position. She knows that her son, Gobar, is equally responsible. She is a loving mother. She even takes care of Heera's children when necessary, she willingly accommodates and shelters the pregnant Seliya, the cobbler's daughter. Dhania has never known a life of peace and comfort, as throughout the novel we see her struggling along with her husband for a livelihood. She is strong and irrespective of caste or creed helps the needy.
 Gobar is the only son of Dhania and Hori. Born into a poor family, he aspires for a life of comfort. Though initially a simpleton like his father, he gets exposure in the city, Lucknow, and learns to be practical and worldly wise. He impregnates Jhunia, Bhola's daughter, and lacking courage to face the wrath of the villagers, flees to the city, leaving Jhunia at his parents' doorstep. His insensitive hasty behaviour creates trouble to Hori, who pays the penalty. Gobar works for Mirza Kursheed, but creates his own business. He also lends money to other people. When he comes to the village dressed as a gentleman with pump shoes, on a short visit, he is unrecognised with difficulty. He becomes the centre of attraction in the village, the other young men are tempted to go to the city seeing him. He promises to get them jobs. Upon learning that Datadin is exploiting his father, he advises his father to come out of the shackles of traditional bindings. He organises a function and with his friends enacts a skit to expose and satirise the mean mentality of the village money lenders and the Brahmin priest. He threatens to drag the priest to court and has a fight with his father on this issue. He realises that Hori is too simple, god fearing and cannot go against his dharma. Angrily, he leaves the village with his wife Jhunia and returns to the city. His weakness for liquour and short tempered nature affects his relation with Jhunia. He realises his mistake only when his devoted wife nurses him during his illness. He works in the sugar factory and later becomes the gardener at Malathi's house.
 Datadin is the village Brahmin priest and a greedy moneylender. It is ironic that this man with low standards goes about the village policing the wrongs of the other villagers. He penalises Hori for accepting and sheltering a low-caste girl, Jhunia, as their daughter-in-law. He is a hypocrite and is blind to the fact that his own son Mataddin is having an affair with Seliya, a cobbler's daughter. He invites pundits from Varanasi to perform the purifying rituals of his defiled son so that he is brought into the mainstream of Brahmanism. He does not pity Hori's poverty, rather takes advantage of his goodness and exploits him.
 Matadin is the son of the Brahmin priest Datadin. He is young and has an affair with Seliya, a low-caste woman who works on the farm for him. The villagers know about it. Seliya does not have entrance to his house. Her parents and relatives hopefully wait for her to be accepted by him. Finally, they decide to punish him and beat him and put a piece of bone into his mouth—a taboo for the Brahmins. But Seliya saves him. Matadin becomes an outcast in his own house. His father performs purifying rituals to bring him back to the mainstream of Brahmanism. He spends a lot of money on the rituals and pundits from Kashi are called in. Matadin's malarial fever which had taken him to death's door has made him realise his mistake in exploiting Selia. When Matadin discovers that he has a son from Seliya, he longs to see the child and goes on the sly in her absence. He is repentant and sends her two rupees through Hori. He realises that he is bound by duty to Seliya and his son. He removes his holy thread and thus liberates himself from the shackles of Brahmanism. Now, he is free to live courageously with Seliya as his wife.
 Bhola is a cowherd of the neighbouring village. He is a widower and has two married sons and a young widowed daughter, Jhunia. Bhola agrees to give Hori a cow on loan and in turn Hori promises to find a companion for him to remarry. Bhola is very upset when his daughter elopes with Hori's son Gobar. He comes to Hori's house on vengeance and claims money for the dead cow. Hori does not have Rs.80, the cost of the cow. Bhola threatens to take his oxen away, that would reduce Hori to a labourer. When Hori pleads with him, Bhola suggests that they should throw Jhunia, their daughter-in-law, and his own daughter out of the house as she had hurt his feelings. This is not acceptable to Dhania, Hori's wife. It is unbelievable that being Jhunia's father, instead of being contended that Hori and his wife have accepted this girl who became pregnant without her marriage being sanctified, he would like to see her sent away with her infant. He heartlessly takes away Hori's oxen and renders him totally helpless.
Heera Hori's younger brother, from whom he is jealous. Hori and Dhania have raised him only. He is married to Punia, whose fighting nature makes him separate from Hori. He assumes that Hori hid the money at the time of Partition, and when Hori borrows a cow from Bhola, he assumes that Hori was hiding the money. Due to this jealousy, he fatally poisons the cow. Fearing the allegation of cow slaughter, he flees. He then comes to the end of the novel, and apologizes to Hori.
Punia Heera's wife, who is of a combative nature. She often quarrels with Dhania. But, after Hira disappeared, she realizes her mistake when Hori helps him. 
Shobha youngest brother of Hori, who loves and respects his both brothers.  
Chuhia is the neighbor of Gobar in the city, who is a close friend of Juniya. She takes care of Juniya and Gobar's son.

The urban society is represented by Malati Devi (doctor), Mr. Mehta (lecturer and philosopher), Mr. Khanna (banker), Rai Sahib (zamindar), Mr Tankha (broker), Mr. Mirza (social worker) and Pandit Omkarnath (publisher).

 Rai Sahib has won the local elections twice. He wanted to marry his daughter off to a rich zamindar to again win in the election and claim the property of his in-laws. Thus, he married his daughter off to another rich, widower and rake zamindar. He claimed and won the zamindari of his in-laws. He won the election and became the municipal minister. But when he planned to get his son married to the daughter of Raja Suryankant for his family's prestige, his son refused that. He is in love with Saroj, the younger sister of Malati Devi. They both married and went away to London. His son claimed and won the entire property Rai Sahib won from in-laws leaving Rai Sahib in huge debt. His daughter got divorced. This eventually left Rai Sahib too dissatisfied despite all his efforts.
 Ms. Malati is a beautiful lady intelligent doctor who is educated in Europe. She is one of the three daughters of Mr. Kaul. She is the centre of attraction in the parties and is flirtatious. Mr. Khanna flirts with her and she is envied and disliked by Govindi. Malati in turn falls in love with Mr. Mehta because of his ideology, his simplicity and intelligence. On a trip to the village of Hori, she explores herself. She starts serving the poor and gets involved in many social activities. After seeing the change in Malati, Mr. Mehta falls in love with Malati. But though Malati loves Mr. Mehta, she refuses his marriage proposal. She now wants to serve the poor and does not want to marry. Mr. Mehta and Malati together serve the poor and needy. Malati Devi is the only character shown as contended at the end of the novel because of her commitment to charitable deeds.
 Mr. Mehta is a scholar and lectures philosophy in a college. He is also authoring a book on philosophy which he dedicates to Malati. Malati and Govindi are two characters who are influenced by him. Govindi finds solace talking to him as he appreciates her concept of womanhood. Malati loses her ego and understands the true meaning of life through him. She learns to serve the poor. He needs the guidance of Malati as he has mismanaged his funds and income in over-generously serving the poor. Though he is interested in marrying Malati, the two mutually agree to remain as friends under the same roof.
 Mr. Khanna is an industrialist and owns a sugar factory. Though married and father of three children, he disrespects his wife Govindi for her traditional values. He flirts with Malati. He is unable to recognise the virtues in his wife. Govindi is fed up of his behaviour and this goads her to leave home. He exploits the labour class. It is only when his sugar factory is destroyed in a fire accident and Govindi stands by him encouraging him to set it up once again, he realise his mistake. Mr. Khanna eventually starts loving his wife.
 Govindi is Mr. Khanna's wife, the rich industrialist, and is epitomised as an ideal Hindu wife. She is virtuous and very tolerant with her husband and children. Mr. Khanna is uninterested in her as he finds fault with her traditional values. He takes interest in Miss Malati and flirts with her. Govindi is desperately dejected and decides to abandon him and his house. But it is Mr. Mehta, who has always been appreciative of her ideals, who advises her to return to the children. She is a moral support to her husband when his sugar factory gets destroyed in fire. It is she who encourages him to set it up again.
Mirza Saheb is a good and jovial person, who always make jokes. When Gobar comes to the city, he first works as a gardener at Mirza Saheb's place. Mirza Saheb is very much influenced by Gobar.

Themes
The novel has several themes:

 Problems due to caste segregation: People of different vocation and their respective castes represent the village. Datadin, the Brahmin priest represents the uppermost caste; he exploits the lower caste villagers with his various religious sanctions. Hori [peasant], Bhola [cowherd], Seliya [a cobbler's daughter] represent the various hierarchies of lower castes in the caste system that exists in India.
 Exploitation of the lower class: Premchand has drawn a realistic picture of the poor peasants exploited by the village zamindar and the greedy moneylenders. The zamindars collected the revenue and imposed fine. Here, Rai Saheb fined Hori for the death of the cow, though he did not kill it. The peasants are unable to pay the debts in time and it gets multiplied with the passage of time. They are caught in a debt trap and they suffer, like Hori, until their end. The author is advocating the need to end the feudal system that existed in the country.
 Exploitation of women: the women characters Dhania, Jhunia, Seliya and Roopa are exploited by the men they love.
 Problems due to industrialisation: Industrialists who exploit labourers, migration of youngsters from the villages to cities, and conflicts in cities.
 Interpersonal relationships, Love, and marriage: Premchand as a progressive writer envisages a modern India where love and inter-caste marriages would thrive. We have the inter-caste marriages of Gobar and Jhunia, Mataadin and Seeliya and that of the educated pair, Rudra Pratap and Saroj. The marital relationship of Mr. Khanna and his wife is strained as he lacks love and respect for her. Mr. Mehta and Miss Malati have serious thought provoking discussions on the issues of love, the institution of marriage, the relation of man and woman and womanhood. They represent the voice of modern India and mutually decide to live as friends serving society in their respective capacities.
 Political scenario of the period: The country was fighting for its liberation from colonial powers. It was the period for the growth and development of different parties and ideologies. Premchand, through the novel, expresses his stand as a socialist. Socialism is a panacea for all kinds of discrimination and exploitation.

The narrative represents the average Indian farmer's existence under colonial rule, with the protagonist facing cultural and feudal exploitation. It shows how the life of these characters takes shape.

Connection with Hinduism
The act of donating a cow in charity, or godaan or gau daan, is considered to be an important Hindu ritual, as it helps in absolving one of sin, and incurring divine blessings. It is also essential. The word dharma has been used 34 times in the novel in different context and by different characters. The word connotes as religion, moral principles and values, conscience and duty. It has a different meaning to each character.

Families in Godaan

Rural Families

Mehto Family 

 (Unnamed parents of Hori) 
 Hori m. Dhania 
 Gobar m. Jhunia 
 Chunnu (deceased)
 Mangal 
 Sona m. Mathuradas 
 Roopa m. Ramsewak 
 Heera m. Punia (Punni) 
 Shobha

Datadeen's family 

 Datadeen 
 Matadeen m. Siliya 
 Ramu

Bhola's family 

 Bhola m. (Unnamed wife) 
 Jangi 
 Kamta 
 Jhunia m. Gobar 
 Chunnu (deceased)
 Mangal 
 Bhola m. Nehri

Urban Families

Raisahab's family 

 Raisahab Amarpal Singh
 Minakshi m. Digvijay Singh
 Rudrapal m. Saroj

Mr. Khanna's family 

 Mr. Khanna m. Govindi 
 Bhishma

Kaul's family 

 Mr. Kaul (Kaul Saab) 
 Ms. Malti m. Mr. Mehra 
 Saroj m. Rudrapal 
 Varda

Legacy 
Godaan is regarded as cult- classic work by Premchand, and it is an immortal Hindi- language creation penned by Premchand. Like other novels of Premchand, Godaan also depicts the social problems of lower class people.

Godaan was made into a Hindi film in 1963, starring Raaj Kumar, Kamini Kaushal, Mehmood and Shashikala. In 2004, Godaan was part of the 27-episode TV series, Tehreer.... Munshi Premchand Ki, based on the writing of Premchand, starring Pankaj Kapur and Surekha Sikri, directed by Gulzar and produced by Doordarshan.

Godaan is an indespensible part of Indian literature. It is regarded as one of the finest work ever written in Indian language.

This novel was translated into 'The gift of Cow' by Jai Ratan and Purushottam Lal.

References

External links
 (review)
Godaan at Hindustan Books

1936 novels
20th-century Indian novels
Hindi-language novels
Indian novels adapted into films
Indian novels adapted into television shows
Novels by Premchand
Novels set in British India